Paul Carew (born 9 July 1967) is an Australian cricketer. He played six first-class matches for Queensland and South Australia between 1986 and 1990.

See also
 List of Queensland first-class cricketers
 List of South Australian representative cricketers

References

External links
 

1967 births
Living people
Australian cricketers
Queensland cricketers
South Australia cricketers
Cricketers from Brisbane